The 1998 Kensington and Chelsea Council election took place on 7 May 1998 to elect members of Kensington and Chelsea London Borough Council in London, England. The whole council was up for election and the Conservative party stayed in overall control of the council.

At the same election, the Kensington and Chelsea saw 70.3% vote in favour of the 1998 Greater London Authority referendum and 29.7% against, on a 27.9% turnout.

Election result
Following the election the Conservative leader of the council, Joan Hanham, was challenged for the leadership of the party group by Daniel Moylan, but Hanham won a ballot of the Conservative councillors to remain leader.

Ward results

References

1998 London Borough council elections
1998
20th century in the Royal Borough of Kensington and Chelsea